Dasmariñas (colloquially shortened to Dasma), officially the City of Dasmariñas, is a 1st class component city in the province of Cavite, Philippines.

This growth is manifested by the influx of major shopping malls, hospitals, universities, banks, industrial parks, and the growing number of residential subdivisions accommodating its growing population.

Etymology
Dasmariñas was named after Gómez Pérez Dasmariñas, the 7th Spanish governor-general of the Philippines who served from 1590 to 1593. After his death, his son Luis Pérez Dasmariñas became the governor-general from 1593 to 1596. Pérez Dasmariñas came from San Miguel das Negradas of Viveiro, in Galicia, Spain.

Dasmariñas literally means "from As Mariñas" (coastal region of Lugo combining the comarcas of A Mariña Occidental, A Mariña Central and A Mariña Oriental), coming itself from mariño ("of the coast, seaside or shore" in the Galician language, the native tongue from Viveiro Galicia, Spain), and this from mar ("sea").

History

Foundation and Spanish rule
In the 19th century during Spanish rule, Dasmariñas was originally called Tampus meaning "end of the forest" in the local Tagalog language. It was formerly a barrio of Imus. It was once a part of a vast Recollect Hacienda that supported the various missionary activities of the Recollects in the Philippines and in Spain.

On April 9, 1864, a council composed of the Archbishop of Manila, the politico-military governor of Cavite, the Prior Provincial of the Augustinian Recollect Order and the parish priest of Imus met to discuss the creation of the new town and parish to separate from Imus. At that time, there were only 643 inhabitants in Tampus. After thorough discussions, Rafaél de Echagüe, the Governor-General of the Philippines approved the creation of the new town on May 12, 1864, with Don Juan Ramirez elected as the first town head or gobernadorcillo. The creation of the town was different from most other towns of Cavite. For the first time, a town was created not by a petition of the local populace and its local officials, as required by legal procedures and custom at that time. Instead, high ranking church officials and the Cavite politico-military governor were the prime initiators of its foundation.

An ensemble of nipa houses in the other barrios of the hacienda like Malinta, Nancaan, Salacay, Paliparan, Malagasang and Salitran were grouped and migrated into a reduccion (reduction) in Tampus in 1866. Reduccion originally meant the religious and civic aspects of missionary activities. Later, it came to mean the process of resettling and unifying a community, thereby creating a newly organized town. For the Spanish missionaries and friars, this process was advantageous not only for evangelization but also for bringing people under the Spanish rule. The new town could be reached through a good network of roads and bridges built by the best architects and engineers of the Recollect Order.

In the same year, it was renamed to Perez-Dasmariñas in honor of the seventh Governor General of the Philippines, Don Gómez Pérez Dasmariñas (1590–1593). Governor Dasmariñas, a Knight of Santiago, was a native of Galicia, Spain and a former magistrate of Murcia and Cartagena, Spain who brought a lot of economic improvements during the early days of colonization.

Towards the end of 1866, Perez-Dasmariñas had complied with the requirements of a typical Philippine town. A spacious town plaza at the center of the town with the church and the convent made of stone and bricks, a courthouse made of wood and nipa, a primary school for children, and various houses made of nipa were built in designated areas. A cemetery was located around 200 yards away from the church and surrounded with wooden fence.

Due to the growing population, the Recollects sent a petition to Madrid for the creation of a new parish in Dasmariñas, independent from Imus. Queen Isabella II signed the Royal Order creating the new parish of Perez-Dasmariñas on October 21, 1866. The following year, the construction of the stone parish church of Dasmariñas dedicated to the Virgin Mary as Our Lady of Immaculate Conception was started.

Barrios
Dasmariñas was made up of several barrios. Salitran was considered the most important and famous during the Spanish regime because it was the site of the Recollect estate house. Salitran came from the Tagalog word sal-it meaning "people from another town". Since it was a part of the Recollect Hacienda of Imus, there were many people from different provinces who lived there working as farmhands. Layong Iloko, a place in Salitran, was named as such because there were Ilocanos who settled there. Pasong Santol in Salitran got its name because of the abundance of santol trees.

Tampus, the center of the newly formed town was located at the end of the deep forest. This is in contrast to one of the sitios in Paliparan which was called Pintong Gubat or "gate of the forest". Sometimes, the name of a barrio is taken from its location, as in the case of Barrio Burol which suggests the high location of the barrio. Sabang on the other hand means "crossroads". Barrio Salawag is believed to be the old barrio Salacay. The word salawag refers to long bamboo poles to which nipa roofing is tied up.

Nancaan, now called Langkaan, was derived from the Tagalog word langka which means "jackfruit". It is the biggest fruit tree in the Philippines which was reportedly brought from India to Malaysia and found its way to our country. The presence of lot of jackfruit trees may be the reason it was called Nancaan.

Malinta or Malintaan, on the other hand was derived from the Tagalog word linta which means "leech" because abundance of leeches in the place.

On July 18, 1899, three more sitios of Perez-Dasmariñas were raised to the rank of barrios. Barrio Sampaloc owing to the abundance of tamarind trees in the place; barrio Tamban was renamed San Jose and Barrio Lucsuhin became San Agustin.

The Philippine Revolution

By June 1896, the Spanish authorities in Cavite province had become suspicious of the local elite's activities. There were alleged top hierarchy meetings of the Recollects in the hacienda houses of Salitran and San Nicolas. Included in the meeting were General Bernardo Echaluce and other top military officials. The purpose of the meeting was to determine whether it was just to apprehend the notable elites who were Freemasons. Fortunately for the elites, no decision was made during the meeting. Thus, the local leaders freely but quietly continued their subversive activities.

As soon as the revolution of 1896 broke out, leaders of Perez-Dasmariñas took up arms against the Spanish rule. Don Placido Campos, the town head at the time and Don Francisco Barzaga, the municipal secretary, gathered the people to liberate their town from Spanish control at the beginning of September 1896. They captured the courthouse and the hacienda house in Salitran, killing the religious clergy who lived there.

As towns in Cavite fell to Filipino revolutionaries, the Spanish government in Madrid felt that Governor-General Ramon Blanco's offensive against the natives was ineffective. Thus, Camilo de Polavieja took over the command of the islands, with General José de Lachambre as the head of the campaign. Gradually, the Spaniards regained the control of the province. After the fall of Silang, the Spaniards focused on Perez-Dasmariñas. Knowing the strength of resistance he might encounter, General Lechambre decided to surround the whole town. He sent to advance units headed by Brigadier General José Molina who went to take the left. The troop under Colonel Arutos who had taken Paliparan, moved westward to cut the escape of the Filipinos to Imus and Carmona. General Lechambre sent the main force towards the south.

The locals suffered terrible defeat because of lack of arms and ammunition. As the Spaniards approached the Poblacion, the revolutionaries retreated the stone building of the town. On February 25, 1897, the Spaniards decided to encircle the Poblacion rather than go directly to the interior. They started burning all buildings except the church. Seeing they were surrounded by fire, some of the rebels went out of hiding but were immediately met by open fire. Those who took refuge at the courthouse refused to come out and were all burned alive. Even those who took refuge in the church did eventually yield to the advancing Spanish forces. By March, Perez-Dasmariñas had fallen back to the Spanish.

Then, General Lachambre returned to Salitran. He expected heavy resistance from the revolutionaries who occupied the hacienda house but to his great surprise, they were able to take the place without any resistance. They hoisted the flag of Spain and converted it to their headquarters.

There were large Filipino casualties according to Lachambre. There were 150 men inside the courthouse when Spaniards set fire to the building and all 150 inside were killed. Others took refuge in the convent, but was also set on fire and the men were shot as they emerged. Others had shut themselves up in the church. With the church surrounded, the mountain artillery was brought up into position and from a distance of 35 meters, the strong doors of the church were bombarded and the troops went in through the breach. At the height of the Battle of Perez Dasmariñas, General Flaviano Yengko, General Crispulo Aguinaldo, Lucas Camerino, Arturo Reyes and many more revolutionaries lost their lives in the battle.

American rule

With the signing of the Treaty of Paris on December 10, 1898, the Philippines was ceded to America by Spain. The American regime brought to Dasmariñas, as it did to other parts of the country, several fundamental changes in the system of government, in language, and in educational system.

In the month of February 1899, the Philippine–American War began. General Henry Ware Lawton's brigade operated south of Manila including the province of Cavite in the middle of June 1899. The Americans could not land directly at Bacoor because Zapote river was defended by the Filipino revolutionists who built trenches as tactical defenses forming three sides of an angle which made the Filipinos hardly visible. The American's 14th Infantry Battalion swam across the during the Battle of Zapote River and under the cover of military artillery, charged against the Filipinos who then retreated to the woods.

Moving southward, the Americans encountered more Filipino revolutionaries in the towns of Bacoor, Imus, and Perez-Dasmariñas, and an infantry battalion narrowly escaped annihilation. News had been brought to the American camp that the Filipino soldiers had evacuated the town and that the native mayor was disposed to surrender it formally to the Americans. The battalion thus went there to take possession, but before reaching the place, the Filipino revolutionists closed in on all sides, and a heavy firefight went on for hours. The Americans were saved from destruction by a desperate bayonet charge when they were rescued by General Weaton's brigade.

Placido Campos, who sided with General Emilio Aguinaldo since the beginning of the Philippine-American War in 1899, was captured together with his nephew Guillermo Campos. They were imprisoned at the Provost Political Prison in Intramuros, Manila where they were kept for six months.

The Americans established military rule in 1900. By order of the colonel of the American troops stationed in Perez-Dasmariñas, the residents of the town nominated a president and a vice-president. Elected through the raising of hands were Francisco Barzaga as president and Conrado Malihan as vice-president. They served their office until the civil government was established by the Americans in 1901.

On January 31, 1901, in accordance with President William McKinley's instructions that the Filipinos be allowed to manage their own municipal governments, the Second Philippine Commission enacted Act No. 82, the new Municipal Code, placing each municipal government under the following officials: the municipal president, the vice-president, and the municipal council, who were elected by qualified voters every two years. In line with this, Placido Campos was again elected as the head of the municipality of Perez-Dasmariñas in October 1901. Francisco Barzaga then became the municipal treasurer. The two were re-elected in 1903.

In 1903, the Americans conducted the first census in the Philippines. Francisco Barzaga and the secretary, Esteban Quique, were made census enumerators for Perez-Dasmariñas under the leadership of Placido Campos. When the census was finished, the total population of the town was only 3,500. Before the revolution of 1898, the population was estimated to be 12,000. Comparing the population prior to the revolution with that of 1948, there has been a decrease in the population of Perez-Dasmariñas.

On January 5, 1905, the municipalities of Bacoor, Imus, and Perez-Dasmariñas were merged, with the seat of government located in Imus.

In 1917, under Governor-General Francis Burton Harrison, Perez-Dasmariñas was again declared a separate municipality. The provincial governor of Cavite, Antero S. Soriano, convened the local leaders, including Placido Campos, Francisco Barzaga, and Felipe Tirona. Together, they agreed to remove the word "Perez" and retain only "Dasmariñas" as the new name of the town. For the second time, Placido Campos headed the town.

World War II

During the Japanese occupation in World War II, the Japanese conducted zonifications in the town. The barrios of Paliparan and Salawag suffered the most number of deaths. Being remote places and thinking that guerrillas were hiding there, these two barrios were zonified two times giving up several lives. The Japanese Imperial Army made the schools as their garrison.

Meanwhile, after surviving in the Bataan Death March and released from the concentration camp in Capas, Tarlac, General Mariano Castañeda returned to Cavite and helped organized the resistance movement in Dasmariñas headed by Colonel Estanislao Mangubat-Carungcong of the 4th Infantry Regiment of Camp Neneng Dasmariñas and Colonel Emiliano de la Cruz of the 14th Infantry Regiment of Camp Paliparan. This unit provided guerilla warfare and was prepared to attack, sabotage missions, cut off enemy communications and logistics, perform recoinnaissance missions, provide protection to civilians against aggression by the Imperial Japanese Army, provide evacuation plans for them, and intensify intelligence reports to the 11th Airborne Division, 187th Glider Infantry Regiment headed by Colonel Harry B. Hildebrand.

In May 1943, The Imperial Japanese Army have received intelligence reports of the guerilla camp of the 4th Infantry Regiment in the west side of the town. They then positioned two long range cannons and fired 30 rounds, damaging rice plantations and crops, killing a large amount of cattle, and terrorized the Poblacion. Nevertheless, vigilant about the situation, the guerillas have narrowly escaped complete annihilation. After the assault, the town became too hot to the Japanese because of the active guerilla activities and the existence of the headquarters of the guerillas in Neneng Dasmariñas, and because of the Sakdalistas and Makapili (Japanese collaborators) denouncing and reporting all guerilla activities of Colonel Estanislao M. Carungcong to the Kempeitai, the Japanese military police, in exchange for payments and privileges. Because of it the Kempeitai made another zonification on July 25, 1943, in the town proper until guerilla regimental staff Lieutenant Colonel Jose M. Carungcong, Major Dominador I. Mangubat, Captain Elpidio Mangubat-Barzaga Sr., and Captain Jovito Evangelista were captured and imprisoned for two months in a prison camp in Muntinlupa until they were released, except for Lieutenant Colonel Jose M. Carungcong, who was sentenced to six years in prison.

On June 24, 1944, the Hunters ROTC guerillas headed by Colonel Emmanuel de Ocampo, Lieutenant Colonal Vic Estacio, and Colonel Eleuterio Terry Adevoso raided the New Bilibid Prison in Muntinlupa and rescued many prisoners of war and a good haul of firearms and ammunition. Among the prisoners rescued was Lieutenant Colonel Jose Carungcong, who managed a jailbreak during the raids of the prison camp. Thereafter, the Japanese Military authorities immediately issued a 50,000 peso reward in exchange for his capture.

On August 25, 1944, with the help of the guerilla soldiers of the 4th Infantry Regiment, 114 Filipino military prisoners, 4 American senior officers, Volckmann's guerilla, and 70 more prisoners of war made a jailbreak at the prison camp in Muntinlupa. They were in poor health condition, deprived of proper meals, and were too skinny. They were kept in Camp Neneng Dasmariñas and given aid and sustenance and were treated by Major Dominador I. Mangubat, who was also a medical doctor, for two months until they recovered from malnutrition.

On December 17, 1944, from about 0100 hours until about 1800 hours, around 1,000 Kempeitai from Fort Santiago conducted another zonification in the poblacion and adjacent barrios. The Immaculate Conception Parish Church was used as their garrison and all suspected male residents involved or coordinating with the guerrilla movement of Colonel Estanislao M. Carungcong, with the advice of the Makapili collaborators, and 15 active guerillas of the Cobra unit of the 4th Infantry Regiment were tortured inside the church and some others that were brought to the back of the Dasmariñas Elementary School were tortured and bayonetted to death. Some were hanged at the old mango tree near the school canteen, whipped, beaten, tortured to forcefully expose and divulge the guerillas. Women were abducted and raped by the Japanese soldier. There were those who experienced the so-called "tinutubig" wherein the head is immersed in a drum of water.

On January 15, 1945, the day before the FACGF General Castañeda - US 11th Airborne Major Jay Vanderpool conference in Camp Neneng Dasmariñas, local guerrillas ambushed nine Japanese soldiers inside a jitney in Anabu Road in Salitran. The next day, on January 16, Japanese soldiers retaliated by firing indiscriminately on the civilian population.

Aside from these, raid after raid were made and male residents were shot to death. Some were killed because they were mistaken as guerrilla members. Some fought face to face, during encounters in Burol, Malinta, Paliparan, and Langkaan, while others were killed in other towns. Most male residents were among those who fought against the Japanese in Bataan and Corregidor Island.

On January 30, 1945, as Allied forces began to land in Nasugbu, Batangas, the guerilla force of the 4th Infantry Regiment under Colonel Estanislao M. Carungcong, a battalion under Major Zacarias Santiaguel of the 1st Infantry Regiment protected the National Highway 17 and attacked enemy positions at the national highway from Palapala Road extending 3000 yards east and west of the National Highway 17 up to Salitran Road. The 14th Infantry Regiment headed by Colonel Emiliano de la Cruz protected the highway between Dasmariñas and Carmona to prevent the enemy to rally a counterattack and to clear the path of the US 11th Airborne Division under General Swing which were being dropped via parachute in Tagaytay. Japanese military vehicles approaching from the north, west, and south sides of the town were ambushed.

FACGF Division Commander General Mariano Castañeda issued the command to liberate Dasmariñas to Colonel Estanislao Mangubat-Carungcong. The combined contingent of the FACGF's 4th Regiment, together with Colonel Lorenzo Saulog's 1st Infantry Regiment and Colonel Maximo Reyes' 11th Infantry Regiment killed 56 Japanese soldiers of the Imperial Japanese Army garrisoned in the town leading to the total liberation of Dasmariñas.

Post-war era

After the war, the Philippines became independent and Dasmariñas started to develop. The population increased because of the mass exodus of families from Metro Manila and nearby provinces.

The Dasmariñas Bagong Bayan (DBB), also known as Dasmariñas Resettlement Area, was established in 1975 by Letter of Instruction No. 19 issued by the then President Ferdinand Marcos.

From 1983 onwards Dasmariñas had an economic boom. Different factories and establishments sprouted in the town which gave way for the growth in population. From a sixth-class municipality, the town became a first-class municipality.

Cityhood

There have been several attempts to convert Dasmariñas into a city. The first attempt was in 1997, when HB08931 was filed by Congressman Renato P. Dragon with other cityhood bills of Imus (HB 08960) and Bacoor (HB 08959). It was filed last February 11, 1997, and read last February 13, 1997. Committee Report N0. 01361 was submitted on December 17, 1997. It was approved on the third reading by the House last January 10, 1998. It did not push through as a Republic Act and no plebiscite happened.

The second attempt was in 2000, when HB099883 was filed by Congressman Erineo Maliksi last March 13, 2000. It was first read last March 13, 2000. It was approved on the Second and Third reading of House last March 15, 2000, and March 27, 2000. It was transmitted to the senate on March 28, 2000, and received on March 31, 2009. It did not push through as a Republic Act and no plebiscite happened.

The idea of converting Dasmariñas into a component city was again proposed for the third time after failure in 1997 and 2000. House Bill no. 5258 converting the municipality of Dasmariñas into a component city was filed by Congressman Elpidio F. Barzaga Jr. last October 3, 2008. It was read last October 6, 2008. It was approved by the House on Second and Third Reading on October 7 and November 17, 2008. It was transmitted and received by the Senate last November 17 and 20, 2008. It was passed by the senate on Second and Third Reading last September 28 and October 5, 2009. It is received by the President of the Philippines last October 14, 2009, and signed as Republic Act 9723 last October 15, 2009.

COMELEC Resolution No. 8682 in connection with the November 25, 2009, plebiscite to ratify the conversion of the municipality of Dasmariñas province of Cavite into a component city pursuant to Republic Act 9723 dated October 15, 2009.

Republic Act No. 9723 was ratified by the registered voters of Dasmariñas through a plebiscite conducted last November 25, 2009, converted the municipality of Dasmariñas in the Province of Cavite into a component city to be known as the City of Dasmariñas. There were about 44,000 voters who cast the plebiscite ballot in the town's 1,508 polling precincts. The yes votes won overwhelmingly. The yes votes got 36,559 while the no votes got 8,141.

Mayor Jennifer Austria-Barzaga, elected in 2007, is both the first female mayor and first city mayor of Dasmariñas since its achieving city status. Since 1892, when Don Placido N. Campos became the first mayor, there have been 23 mayors of the city.

On 2011, the Paro-Paro Festival was first celebrated. It is celebrated every November 26 to commemorate the incorporation of the city of Dasmariñas with people dancing and parading in the streets in butterfly costumes.

In November 2013, the Paru-Paro Festival was cancelled, instead the allocated funds will be donated to the Typhoon Yolanda victims.

As of the 2020 census, the city recorded a population of more than 700,000. The city serves as a catalyst for major economic development and sustained growth for the Greater Manila Area since the 1990s. The influx of industries, educational and health institutions, shopping malls, and real estate developments is significant.

Geography

It is bounded by Imus and Bacoor to the north, Silang to the south , Muntinlupa City and Las Piñas City in Southern MetroManila to the north east portion and General Mariano Alvarez and City of San Pedro ,in Laguna to the east, and General Trias to the west.

The city center, or the poblacion, is on the westernmost part of the city, Sabang, San Jose, Salawag and Salitran are in the north, San Agustin, Langkaan, and Sampaloc are in the south, Paliparan is on the easternmost part, while Burol and Bagong Bayan are in the middle, sandwiched between the Poblacion and Paliparan.

The city of Dasmariñas is landlocked. It is about the same distance from Laguna de Bay and about 27 kilometers from the resort city of Tagaytay and the famous Taal Lake.

At present, Dasmariñas is served by corridors traversing the central areas which provide linkages to the Metropolitan Manila area core in the north and the developing nodes of Laguna and Batangas.

Topography

Dasmariñas is partly lowland and partly hilly. The Poblacion itself is elevated. Generally, land near rivers and creeks are rugged. Dasmariñas is outside the typhoon belt and has no fault line constraints. Further, it is served by natural drainage system since it is traversed by several rivers and water tributaries draining to the Manila Bay. The city has not yet to experience floods.

These are dispersed among Burol, Langkaan, Paliparan, Salawag, Sampaloc and San Agustin. Areas with slopes 10.1 to 18% cover about 575.72 hectares of land in portions of Salawag, Salitran, Burol, and other parts.

Climate

Dasmariñas has a tropical wet and dry climate (Köppen climate classification: Aw) with two pronounced seasons: wet season and dry season. Wet season covers the period from May to December of each year and dry season covers the period from January to April.

Demographics

From the original 643 inhabitants of the old Perez-Dasmariñas, the population grew and so did the town. By 1888, there were already more than 4,576 people living in Perez Dasmariñas. Gradually, the economic life of the people improved. The inquilinos (lessees) of the hacienda rose to become the middle class. Dasmariñas, 8,664 hectares were all farmed in 1890 except for 3,770 hectares (including parcels at Gatdula and Balimbing). Lessees paid the usual land rent base on the measurement of lowland and upland riceland set up by the "uldog" (friar administrator) of casa hacienda de Salitran. In the 1880s, there were 200 quinones of dry and 50 quinones of wet ricelands yielding some 2,300 cavanas of palay, 5,000 piculs of mucavado sugar, 50 cavans of corn and camote, 60 piculs of tao and 25 piculs of peanuts. Dasmariñas was a highly advanced town where not only textiles from Batangas and Bulacan looms, but also imported European cloth from Manila reached the town elites. Fish and other staple food however still came from nearby towns. Surprisingly until 1880, there was no public market in the town. There was a principal public dirt road in Perez-Dasmariñas that went to Silang which was passable to all kinds of vehicle only during dry season, but reachable only by foot and horseback during wet season. By 1870, mails from Manila were received at a central station in Cavite Puerto where it was sorted. Mails were brought via Kawit, then Imus then Dasmariñas.

Culturally, Perez-Dasmariñas was not too behind for by 1874 there were already two competing brass bands in the town. Don Valeriano Campos, an inquilino and a former gobernadorcillo of the town (1879 to 1881) organized one of the brass bands. He was popularly known as Capitang Vale. He was the highest taxpayer and owned a house made of cogon and wood on Calle Real with an appraised value of P300. His son Placido Campos learned his trade and also considered a man of means. Manuela Monzon, another well to do woman owned a house at the town's main street. The house made of nipa and wood was valued at P200 and was rented as a boys' school for P72.

Nonetheless in 1892, there was a noticeable decrease of the male population. As conflict between the friar-hacenderos, the inquilinos and casamas multiplied more people went into hiding in the deep forest of Perez-Dasmariñas. The rise of tulisanismo in Cavite was often connected with agrarian problems in the hacienda town owned by the friars.

The city has 75 barangays, has more than 180 subdivisions and the biggest resettlement area in the Philippines, the Dasmariñas Bagong Bayan (DBB).

Most affluent families from Metro Manila and nearby towns and provinces have chosen Dasmariñas to be their home due to its proximity to the National Capital Region. The mass exodus of people here in Dasmariñas is also brought about by the industrial boom which brought about more jobs. There are also a big number of foreign residents such as Koreans, Chinese, Japanese, Americans, Hindus, Britons and Eurasians. Because of this, Dasmariñas can be also considered as the "Melting Pot" of Cavite.

Religion

Christianity is the predominant faith, composed of Roman Catholics, Protestants, and other independent Christian groups.

Majority of the population are Roman Catholics. The city is the seat of the Vicariates of Immaculate Conception and Our Mother of Perpetual Help under the jurisdiction of Diocese of Imus.

Other prominent religious groups includeChurch of God World Missions, Philippines and the local Church of God Dasmariñas, serve as the National Office of the Church of God based in Cleveland, Tennessee. Jesus Miracle Crusade International Ministry (Dasma Outstation, Iglesia ni Cristo, United Church of Christ in the Philippines (UCCP), Day by Day Christian Ministries, Jesus Is Lord Church (JIL), Evangelica Unida De Cristo, Victory Christian Fellowship, United Pentecostal Church (Phils), Inc., World Mission Church, The United Methodist Church, Herald of Grace Covenant Bible Church of Cavite, Presbyterian Churches, Baptist and Bible Fundamental churches, Seventh Day Adventist Churches, Members Church of God International known as Ang Dating Daan, The Lord's Hand Family Apostolic Church, and The Jesus People (TJP), also known as Jesusites.

A considerable percentage of the population are also composed of Muslims.

Religious tolerance exists among members of different sects.

Languages
The city has a majority of English and Tagalog speakers. Almost all households in the city are bilingual and know how to speak English. Due to its proximity to Metro Manila and being part of the Greater Manila Area, there is also a considerably minor number of speakers of Bicolano, Ilocano, Ilonggo, Cebuano, Pangasinan, Kapampangan and Chavacano.

Cityscape

The City of Dasmariñas is divided into eleven unofficially-defined administrative districts and is subdivided into 75 barangays.

Poblacion

The Poblacion is the city center which is home to Dasmariñas' old residents. The newly renovated old church of the Parish of Our Lady of the Immaculate Conception, Dasmariñas Library, Dasmariñas Elementary School and the Immaculate Conception Academy-Science High School are located in the town's plaza. Municipal Government's municipio or the town hall is located a few meters away from the plaza. Near the Poblacion is the De La Salle University-Health Sciences Campus and the DLSU-Medical Center, the 1st ISO Certified Hospital in the Philippines. Divided into four zones, the town's center is mostly residential area but is still lined with many business establishments. Celebrations, shows and gatherings are being held at the plaza. Every December 8, the town's Poblacion celebrates the Solemnity of the Immaculate Conception wherein colorful banderitas, loud marching bands and expectacular display of fireworks are seen and is being visited by many people coming from the different towns in Cavite. Cultural shows and many celebrations are happening here almost weekly so it has the rightful claim to be called "The Liveliest City in Cavite". Numerous establishment located here are Dasmariñas Central Market, Waltermart Dasmariñas, NSN Mall Dasmariñas, Volets Commercial Mall, Antler's Square, Puregold, Super 8, SukiMart, DC Mart, CM Plaza Mall, and MG Motors Dasmariñas.
Most of institutional, commercial and thrift banks of the city are also in this area.

Five barangays are located in this district.
 Zone I
 Zone I-A (A stands for Aguinaldo because of its location along Aguinaldo Highway)
 Zone II
 Zone III
 Zone IV

San Agustin

Kasuyan is its first name of this place, during the Spanish period, because of the presence of many cashew trees on the area. After many years, its name became Luksuhin and on July 18, 1889, it was renamed again by the petition passed by Don Juan Bautista requesting the place be named after San Agustin. The place is lying between the Poblacion and Sampaloc in the north. Farming was the chief source of income of the people here. San Agustin is blessed with rich soil that can be planted with rice, sugarcane, fruits and vegetables. Here, vast lands with big mango trees can be found. There was a continuous flow of water coming from Bucal to the Poblacion during the Spanish period which they call Simbro. However, due to the town's development, most lands are now being converted into subdivisions and other business establishments. On December 17, 1944, three persons living here were killed at the sona (zonification) in the Poblacion. They were Conrado Aledia, Primitivo Sango and Matiaga Ramirez. Today, the place is on development. The business establishments located here are the Vista Mall Dasmariñas and Kia Dasmariñas, JAC Motors Dasmariñas, Nissan Dasmariñas.

There are also a township estate in this Barangay named Idesia City Dasmariñas a 37 hectares partnership between PA Properties and Hankyu Hanshin that consist of Commercial, Retail, BPO Offices and Residential such as Midrise Condominiums and Subdivisions

Three barangays are located in this district.
 San Agustin I
 San Agustin II
 San Agustin III

San Jose

This barangay is situated between the Poblacion and Sabang. On April 13, 1889, a petition was passed appealing the sitio, once known Sitio Tamban, to be transformed into a barangay. The place was renamed on July 18, 1889, and was given the name San Jose in commemoration of their patron saint, St. Joseph. Cumpuerta is the name of the hide-out of the Filipino revolucionarios during the revolution against Spain. This is a deep canal of flowing water which still exists until now. The families of Cantada, Villena, Reyes, Mendoza, Camañag, Ramos, and Pastor are the first ones who settled here.

Only one barangay is located in this district, its namesake, Barangay San Jose.

Salitran

This place is known for the name "Salitran" even during the Spanish period. There are no exact historical accounts for the origin of the name. Some says that such name was given because the early settlers of this place were from Pampanga, Visayas, Tagalog region and some Chinese that served the Spanish friars. However, according to the original settlers here, the place was originally called "Bayanan". They said that this has numerous big Spanish houses which is like in a small town. An old house in the eastern part of Salitran was used by the Spanish friars as the storage place for the rice and was called "Makina". It was also used as a headquarters by the Guardia Civil. When the revolution ignited, the "Makina" became the center of attack by the revolucionarios from the Poblacion and this barrio. The friars weren't aware of the said assault. On March 7, 1897, the Spanish went to Salitran where the Magdalo soldiers led by Gen. Emilio Aguinaldo hid. General Emilio Aguinaldo received help from one thousand men and formed a greater force and even the Spanish troops led by General Lechambre didn't penetrate Salitran. Because of the rebelry, the Spanish burned all the houses and establishments in the barrio. There were only left three houses unburned. During the World War II, Simplicio Lara and Teodorico Timbang were killed by the Japanese soldiers. 
Now, Salitran is on vast development due to the presence of numerous subdivisions and villages. Schools located here are the St. Jude College, West Hill Academy, The Immaculate Conception Academy-North Campus, and many others. There are also many business establishments here such as Central Mall Dasmariñas, Toyota Dasmariñas, Mitsubishi Dasmariñas, Hyundai Dasmariñas and Honda Dasmariñas, Suzuki Dasmariñas. Emilio Aguinaldo College Medical Center also located here.

Four barangays are located in this district.
 Salitran I
 Salitran II
 Salitran III
 Salitran IV

Sabang

On the northern part of Dasmariñas is where this barangay can be traveled and found. The word "Sabang" means "to overflow", wherein the creeks running from Malagasang, Imus tend to inundate in this place. This were made by the Spanish friars to irrigate the vast rice fields of the barangay. The diversion in the direction of the water flow had vastly made changes in the agriculture during the Spanish period, for there was a rich production of rice corps. Because of this, a bodega was made here for the storage of rice and was called the "Kamalig ng Pare" (Silo of the Priest). This place is considered to be the richest land in Dasmariñas. Residents here were known to be industrious. Agriculture is still a source of income in this barangay, though it has diminished due to the development of its agrarian lands into subdivisions and schools for children. More than 85% of the population are professionals and have a high standard of living. In this place, the Madona Charity Clinic is located, owned by Mrs. Bracia Tengko. This clinic provides aid and relief to the less fortunate residents seeking medical help. At the back of the Madona Clinic was a Rock with a Spring of Water (Bucal ng Tubig) at the Ylang-Ylang River. It was believed to have healing properties or miracles. In 2007 the Land Transportation Office Dasmariñas or LTO Dasmariñas District Office was established with the sponsorship and pioneering efforts of Mrs. Carmelita Carungcong Canete to better serve the ever-growing population of Dasmariñas and its increasing pool of motor vehicles.

This Barangay is also the birthplace of a Caviteno robinhood folk hero Leonardo Manicio, also known as "Nardong Putik".

Only one barangay is located in this district, its namesake, Barangay Sabang.

Burol

The complete name of barrio Burol is Pansol-Burol. Pansol is a Tagalog word meaning aqueduct, while Burol, also a native word, means mound. Even though there are no historical records about its establishment, it is safe to say that it was formed during the Spanish period due to the presence of ruins of old Spanish houses and sugarmills. The families of Quillao and Beltran are the first ones to settle in this place. This barangay became the hide-out of the Katipuneros/revolucionarios. During the Japanese occupation, there are some Dasmarineños who were killed in this place. They were Alfredo Purificacion, Pedro Calupad, Jose Yñota, Victor de Jesus and Angel Olaes. The Japanese soldiers also planted several cotton trees on the area. Now, this place is considered one of the richest barangay in Dasmariñas. There are series of commercial strip within the stretch of Governor Mangubat Avenue. Many schools and colleges can be found here such as the Southern Luzon College, International English Center, Asian Trinity School, and many others. Adjacent to the place is the Emilio Aguinaldo College. Numerous subdivisions and villages are also located here. Also Found here are the SMDC Green 2 Residences Dasmariñas and The One Place Dasmariñas.

The New Proposed Dasmariñas Government Center is now being built in this Barangay. That includes Kolehiyo Ng Lungsod Ng Dasmariñas, Grandstand, Football field with track oval, Dasmariñas Arena (COD Arena), Dasmariñas Boxing Gym and The new Dasmariñas Socio Economic and Multi purpose Building (New City Hall). Also located here are the new urban public park named Promenade Des Dasmariñas situated along the Imus river. Soon it will have a commercial portion within the complex.

Only one barangay is located in this district, its namesake, Barangay Burol Main.

Langkaan

This place is located on the south-western part of Dasmariñas. The name "Langkaan" came from the word "langka" meaning jackfruit; which is believed to be planted in many parts of this barangay during the 1900, the year of its foundation. Barangay Langkaan was a part of a vast hacienda during the Spanich period that's why there are numerous water systems for ricefields that can be found here. The San Agustin Dam was constructed in 1855. On the last part of the 19th century, the Spaniards erected an indigo plantation here. The stone-made grinder of indigo still exists until now and it is the mark of the Spanish influence in the place. The Spaniards are the first ones who planted sugar canes and became the primary source of income during the 18th century. During those times, tarapiche and carabaos are used to make panucha and paldo. Don Placido Campos and Andres Medina are the ones who owned these tarapiche. When the Americans arrived, this place attracted residents from the Poblacion. The families Quillao, Bautista, Sarabusab, Reyes, Remulla, Sango, Laudato, Empeño, Satsatin, Medina, de Lima and others transferred here during those times. During the Second World War, the Japanese had a big plantation of cotton trees in Langkaan. Dasmarineños were forced to work here. A Japanese concentration camp was also established in this area. Now, Langkaan is considered to be the backbone of the economic progress of Dasmariñas. The presence of numerous factories in different industrial estates in this area, such as Monterey Meat Plant, First Cityland Industrial Estate and the First Cavite Industrial Estate and  other Business Establishment, serves as the working place for the workers living in Dasmariñas and other towns of Cavite as well.

There are also schools and colleges within the area such as  Immaculate Conception Academy south, St. Francis Academy and St.Paul Technological Institute of Cavite. Also found in this area is the St.Paul Parish Church and Qubo Qabana Resorts

Two barangays are located in this district, these are:
 Langkaan I
 Langkaan II

Paliparan

Paliparan is situated at the southeastern part of Dasmariñas. In the easternmost part, is surrounded by the municipalities of Gen. Mariano Alvarez, Cavite and San Pedro, Laguna. This place was a grassy land with no trees growing on its wide space providing an excellent place for flying kites during summer. In fact, this was what used to be – a paliparan – meaning an airfield for flying kites. During the Spanish period, the Spaniards used to go to this place during weekends to fly kites of different designs and colors. The first settlers here came from the town of Imus. Among them are the families of Faustino Alvarez, Flaviano Pakingan, Gregorio de la Cruz, Pablo Papa, Dominguez and the Martinez. In 1911, most of the residents here are said to be uneducated because there were only eight persons who can vote. Also during the Spanish period, this place became a hiding place for the Katipuneros/revolucionarios. During the Japanese occupation, some hide-outs of the guerillas were found here such as of "P.Q.O.G., R.C.T.C. Hunters, Reyes Regimen and Saulog Regimen". In June 1943, the Japanese ordered the residents to assemble in front of the school wherein they were not given food and water from morning until evening. Suspected guerrilla members were killed. This barangay is sub divided into six sitios which are Nyugan (on the west), Pintong Gubat, Paliparan Site (on the north), Paliparan Ilaya (also on the north), Pook and Burol (on the north-east). Today, it is considered to be one of the richest barangay in Dasmariñas because of the many factories and industrial estates that are located here. Among them are the Pepsi Cola Philippines Sales Office Dasmariñas, Reynold's Corporation, Molave Compound, Dasmariñas Technopark and many others.
Business establishment located here are Unitop Dasmariñas, Wilcon depot, Ultramega, Super 8, WeMart and Puregold. Also found here are the Famous Tubigan Resort and Coco Valley Resort.
Villar's Island Park Villages also located here.

There will be a township development by Vista Land Company within the Barangay Paliparan 1, named as Praverde Dasmariñas that houses a commercial strip, a mall, retail store, BPO Offices and Residential such as Subdivision and midrise Condominium.

Three barangays are located in this district, these are:
 Paliparan I
 Paliparan II
 Paliparan III

Salawag

Barangay Salawag is the largest barangay of the city in terms of land area and population. It is located in the north-eastern part of Dasmariñas. Such name was given to this place due to the presence of bamboo trees (salawag in archaic Tagalog) made for the construction of houses. This barangay had many names during the olden times. The Spanish called this "Pasong Tinta" because there were many plants called "tinta-tintahan" used as an ink. This was also called "Horong Bato" because the early settlers believed that there is a treasure here buried under a large rock. During the arrival of the Americans, the place was called "Mataas na Sampalok" because there were numerous tall sampaloc (tamarind) trees planted here. The first families to live here are the Macalinao, Pacifico, Purificacion, Topacio and Paras; while the richest families living here are the Acuzar, Panerio and Muncada families. Only one barangay is located in this district, its namesake, Barangay Salawag.

Today, this place is considered one of the richest barangay in Dasmariñas. The barangay boasts of the world-class Orchard Golf and Country Club, the site of the 1995 Johnnie Walker Golf Tournament and a state university, the Technological University of the Philippines – Cavite Campus, established in 1979 and Cavite School of Life Dasmariñas Campus. Many subdivisions and villages are also located here, such as Golden City, San Marino City, Avida Santa Catalina Village, Avida Sta Cecilia Village, Avida Residences Dasmariñas, Filinvest Subdivision Dasmariñas, Orchard Estates and The Courtyard Vermosa. Many Commercial establishments include Ayala's, The District Mall Dasmariñas, Vista All Home Salawag, SM Savemore Salawag and SM Savemore San Marino and large concentration of commercial strip along Salawag - Paliparan road.

Salawag is also unique among the barangays in the city as it has two Catholic churches serving its huge population. First established was Mary Immaculate Parish in NIA Road, built in 2003 under the pastoral care of the Sons of the Holy Mary Immaculate, which is also the home of Salawag's patroness: Maria Inmaculada de Salawag, whose image is reported to be miraculous and was Episcopally Crowned on December 8, 2018, by the Bishop of Imus, Most Rev. Reynaldo G. Evangelista. Second was Pope John XXIII Parish in San Marino City, established in 2016.

Two townships led by two of the country's largest real estate companies, Ayala Land's Vermosa and Vista Land's Vista City, both include areas under the jurisdiction of Barangay Salawag.

Sampaloc

There were numerous sampaloc (English: tamarind) trees in this place that's why it was given such name. It has the largest land area in Dasmariñas. Today, this place is considered one of the richest district and the economic zone of Dasmariñas.
 
The Central Business District or CBD of the city is located in this barangay. Major shopping Mall located here are the SM City Dasmariñas and Robinson's Place Dasmariñas. Also found here are the Dasmariñas Central Transport Terminal, Araw Araw Market,  Fortune King Shopping Center, Isuzu Dasmariñas, Citi Hardware, MetroGate Commercial Complex and Dasmariñas Commercial Complex.  Sitios formed here in 1896 were Palapala, Bukal, Malinta, Manalo, Piela and Talisayan. In Pala-Pala, the National University Dasmariñas, Philippine Christian University Dasmariñas and the Union Theological Seminary can be found. Stanley Electric Phils. Inc. is located in Malinta and more than half of the land is owned by the International Institute of Rural Reconstruction. EuroMed Laboratories, Yakult Philippines and New Era Village of Iglesia ni Cristo (Church of Christ) are in Bucal. PhilFlex and Meralco depot are located in Talisayan. 
There are many subdivisions and villages located in this area some of them are Greenwoods, Metrogate Estate, La Mediterranean, Washington Place, St.Charbel South and many more.
There also many factories here such as Syndenham Laboratories Inc., Coca-Cola Bottlers Phils. Inc. and Miescor Builders Inc.

BPO located here is the IQOR Philippines in SM City Dasmariñas and in Robinson's Place Dasmariñas.

Five barangays are located in this district, these are:
 Sampaloc I   ( Pala-pala )
 Sampaloc II  ( Bucal/Malinta )
 Sampaloc III ( Piela/Manalo )
 Sampaloc IV  ( Talisayan )
 Sampaloc V   ( New Era )

Dasmariñas Bagong Bayan

Dasmariñas Bagong Bayan (DBB) was established in 1975 under the government of Pres. Ferdinand Marcos. This land was bought by the PHHC or the People Homesite Housing Corporation to the owners at two million and four hundred thousand pesos (P2,400,000) which then became the resettlement area for the less-privileged families living in the depressed areas of Metro Manila. The families of Eduardo Coronel, Rogelio Tomas, Ruben Alvarez, Manuel Rabang, Aurora Dela Cruz and Diosdado Alto were the first ones to live here. Diosdado Alto, Rodolfo Urubia, Danilo Serrano, Maximo Esteban, Manuel Macuto and Francisco Gonzales became the first barangay leaders.

Each families were given  which they loan from the NHA or the National Housing Authority. On September 12, 1990, the Sangguniang Bayan (Municipal Council) passed Order 108-90 ordering DBB to be divided into 47 barangays which then was approved by the authority.

Today, the Congressional Avenue is lined with numerous schools and business establishments. The SM Market Mall Dasmariñas and Kadiwa market offers goods at cheaper price which then serve as an alternative market for the town. Schools such as the Dasmariñas Central Elementary School and Dasmariñas Integrated High School are just nearby the market. Along the said avenue sits the De La Salle University-Dasmariñas Campus.

There are many Public market all over the area. Also found here are  St.Paul Hospital and Pagamutan Ng Dasmariñas. Includes within the area is the Dasmariñas library and Dasmariñas Schools division office.

This district has the most number of barangays, 49.

 DBB-A-1
 San Dionisio
 San Esteban
 Santo Cristo
 Santo Niño I
 Santo Niño II
 DBB-A-2
 San Juan
 Santa Lucia
 DBB-A-3
 San Manuel I
 San Manuel II
 San Miguel I
 San Miguel II
 St. Peter I
 St. Peter II
 DBB-B
 Burol I
 Burol II
 DBB-C
 Burol III
 San Andres I
 San Andres II
 San Roque
 San Simon
 Santa Cristina I
 Santa Cristina II
 Victoria Reyes
 DBB-D
 Luzviminda I
 Luzviminda II
 San Nicolas I
 San Nicolas II
 San Mateo
 DBB-E
 Emmanuel Bergado I
 Emmanuel Bergado II
 San Lorenzo Ruiz I
 San Lorenzo Ruiz II
 San Luis I
 San Luis II
 Santa Cruz I
 Santa Cruz II
 DBB-F
 Fatima II
 Fatima III
 DBB-G
 San Isidro Labrador I
 San Isidro Labrador II
 DBB-H
 Santa Veronica (H-2)
 Sultan Esmael (H-1)
 DBB-I
 San Francisco I
 San Francisco II
 Santa Fe
 DBB-J
 San Antonio de Padua I
 San Antonio de Padua II
 Santa Maria
 DBB-K
 Fatima I

Economy

The city of Dasmariñas is one of the fastest growing local government units in the province of Cavite. Numerous commercial establishments, which include major shopping malls, fast foods chain, groceries, banks, convenient stores, restaurants and other service-oriented businesses, are mostly concentrated in the City Centre and the Central Business District. Industrial establishments are located in the outskirts of the city. It has the greatest number of universities in the province.

From an agricultural-based economy, the town of Dasmariñas has evolved into a highly urbanized, commercialized, industrialized and financialized city. It now boasts of three industrial estates, namely: First Cavite Industrial Estate (FCIE) in Barangay Langkaan, Dasmariñas Technopark located in Barangay Paliparan I and NHA Industrial Park in Bagong Bayan. Aside from these industrial areas, there are 240 other factories/business establishments scattered in the different barangays that sum up to 309 operational industries in the city. Dasmariñas is home to hundreds of thousands of residents who occupy more than 180 residential subdivisions and villages in the city. It also serves as a haven to investors with its industrial estates and diverse pool of manpower. The rapid growth of the city's population near universities, industrial estates and factories provides a ready market for real estate ventures such as subdivisions, apartments, hotels, condominiums and other support services. Its infrastructure projects involving major road construction and widening support the city in its functional role as one of the residential, commercial, industrial, financial and university centers of Cavite. To protect its environment, Dasmariñas has adopted its Luntiang (English: Green) Dasmariñas program, which is envisioned to plant 100,000 seedlings planted over the town during the year 2000.

In 2012, the city posted PHP 1,137,968,919 in income, with 37% of it (PHP 420,844,216) sourced locally.

Commerce

Commerce and trade transactions are intensively undertaken in the identified commercial areas along Don Placido Campos Avenue, Camerino Avenue, Governor's Drive Emilio Aguinaldo Highway, Jose Abad Santos Avenue, Carlos Trinidad Avenue, Molino - Paliparan Road, Gov.Mangubat Avenue, Congressional Avenue, Congressional Road, Amuntay Road and other areas particularly in Barangay Paliparan and in Dasmariñas Bagong Bayan.

Commercial establishments are lined along major thoroughfares. A strip pattern of commercial growth are evident at other Barangay's in Dasmariñas.

Commercial developments along Aguinaldo Highway from Silang to Pala-Pala junction particularly within areas adjacent to the Congressional Avenue and Salitran shows the nature and extent of commercial activities in Dasmariñas. The presence of local commercial centers or shopping centers such as the Highway Plaza, CM Plaza and a branch of a Metro Manila-based shopping center, the Walter Mart which houses different local and nationwide known commercial establishments sets the trend of commercial developments in that part of the city. These are further enhanced by the presence of banks, financial centers and other establishments. There are also commercial establishments supportive of or are offshoots of the educational and medical services being rendered by the De La Salle University Medical Center and the Dr. Jose P. Rizal National Medical Research Center. 
These makes the area a financial and commercial district of the city. The old commercial developments within the Poblacion area (Zone I, I-A, II, III and IV) provides for the needs of the old town residents and the subdivision migrants on the Southern portion of the city. The nature of commercial activity being that of a neighborhood commercial center supports the daily needs of the population. The new location of the public market opens the city to the neighboring marketing population of other settlement areas. It likewise make the public market accessible to all the population both from the resettlement areas and the old townsite. Thus, the financial and commercial activity in the Poblacion, the Dasmariñas Central Market, the NSN Dasma (Highway Plaza Mall), Volets Commercial Mall, Antler's square, CM Plaza Mall, Old Kadiwa Market, DC Mart, The Dasmariñas Commercial Complex, Terraza Dasmariñas, SM City Dasmariñas, SM Marketmall Dasmariñas, Robinsons Place Dasmariñas, Walter Mart Dasmariñas, Central Mall Dasmariñas, The District – Dasmariñas, Vista Mall Dasmariñas, Unitop Dasmariñas and soon to open Ventura Mall Dasmariñas enhance the commercial center role of Dasmariñas.

Industry

Dasmariñas is an industrial city. The growth has been greatly influenced by its proximity to Metro Manila and the national government's industrial boom. It becomes the choice location for business enterprises being in a crossroad of development south of Manila.

Industrial developments along the Governor's Drive (Carmona-Ternate Road) specifically the First Cavite Industrial Estate, the Reynold's Phils. and different industries dotting the road from Carmona and Silang boundaries to General Trias as well as those at the southeastern portion of Aguinaldo Highway providing employment and livelihood opportunities to the locals. Taxes are being paid by these industries help provide for the basic services and amenities of the city.

On the southwestern part of the city is First Cavite Industrial Estate, a  industrial subdivision located at Langkaan provides adequate facilities to light/medium industries. It is a joint project of the National Development Company, Marubeni Corporation, and the Japan International Development Organization Ltd. Situated in Dasmariñas, the estate is complete with power supply, water system, and telecommunication facilities, with 1,500 lines. The estate includes a General Industrial Zone, which has a customs office and warehouse.

Preferred locators are those involved in non-pollutive small and medium-scale industries. Presently, 48 companies have located their business in this state.

The Dasmariñas Bagong Bayan – NHA Industrial Estate is about 8.6 hectares. The Local Waterworks Utilities Administration manages the water system. Its 18 pumps and its 18 elevated storage tanks, having an average capacity of 60,000 gallons each, can very well serve the needs of the occupants. Labor-intensive, export-oriented, non- hazardous, and non-pollutive industries are best situated in the area. GMA-NHA Industrial Estate The General Mariano Galvez – NHA Industrial Estate compromises 10 hectares of land in the municipality of Gen. Mariano Alvarez. Types of industries preferred for this estate are those, which are non-pollutive, labor-intensive, export-oriented, and non-hazardous such as the 6 companies that have located therein. Other industrial estates located in Dasmariñas are the Dasmariñas Techno Park in Paliparan 1, Molave Compound in Paliparan 2 and City Land Industrial Estate Dasmariñas in Langkaan 2.

Real Estate
Vista Land launched Vista Alabang in 2014, a township of 2,500 hectares spanning the area where Muntinlupa, Las Piñas, Bacoor and Dasmariñas meet, with the University Town area of the township under the jurisdiction of Dasmariñas. There are plans to establish a New University of the Philippines campus in the University Town area in Dasmariñas, Cavite which will focus on technopreneurship.

Meanwhile, Ayala Land established Vermosa, a 700-hectare township straddling the cities of Imus and Dasmariñas in 2015. The first project named The Courtyards span an area also under the city.

Also another 37 hectares Township Estate development named Idesia City Dasmariñas of PA Properties in partnership with Hankyu Hanshin Inc. located in San Agustin 1.

A new 12 hectares Township Estate development is now being built in Barangay Paliparan 1 named Praverde Dasmariñas under Vista Land.

Local government

Dasmariñas has been a municipality and later a component city with a mayor-council form of government since its establishment in 1866.

The mayor is the chief executive of the city. He is elected to serve a three-year term, with a maximum of three terms. The incumbent city mayor is Jennifer Barzaga, who succeeded her husband, now congressman, Elpidio Barzaga Jr.  She previously held this post from 2007 until 2016, she served as the member of the House of Representatives for 4th District from 2016 until 2019.

The vice mayor is the presiding officer of the Sangguniang Panglungsod ng Dasmariñas (English: City Council of Dasmariñas). He is also the chief executive of the city whenever the mayor is out of the city. He is elected to serve a three-year term, with a maximum of three terms. The incumbent vice mayor is Rex Mangubat, incumbent since 2016.

The Sangguniang Panglungsod ng Dasmariñas (English: City Council of Dasmariñas) is composed of 12 members with 2 ex officio members which are the Association of Liga ng mga Barangay ng Dasmariñas (English: League of Barangays of Dasmariñas) President and the Sangguniang Kabataan (English: Youth Council) Federation President. There are 20 committees in the city each headed by a chairman who is a city councilor. They are elected to serve a three-year term, with a maximum of three terms.

The city officials from June 30, 2019, to June 30, 2022. They were elected last May 13, 2019, during the 2019 Philippine national and local elections, which since 2007, all candidates from the Barzaga's group (Team Dasma) sweep the Municipal/City council.

Heads

Except for lack of dates of the terms of the gobernadorcillos (also popularly referred to as captain) during the Spanish regime, the list of town heads of Dasmariñas is complete from its founding to the present.

Gobernadorcillos (1868–1895)
 Juan Ramirez
 Adriano Llano
 Eduardo Bautista
 Anastacio Paulme
 Valeriano Campos
 Eugenio Ambalada
 Ligario Malihan
 Leon Mangubat
 Lino Alcantara
 Fausto Bautista
 Gregorio Baustista

Capitan Municipal (1895–1896)
 Placido Campos, 1895–1896

Municipal Presidents (1900–1935)
 Francisco Barzaga, 1900
 Placido Campos, 1901

Municipal Presidents under Imus Government (1905–1916)

Effectivity of the law passed in 1901 combining the municipalities of Imus, Dasmariñas and Bacoor with its seat of government in Imus.
 Cesar A. Fontanilla, 1905–1913
 Felipe Topacio, 1912–1915
 Cecilio Kamantigue, 1915–1916

Municipal Presidents (1917–1948)
 Placido Campos, 1917–1918
 Felipe Tirona, 1919–1921
 Francisco Barzaga, 1922–1924
 Isidro Sanchez Mangubat, 1924–1928
 Emilio Aledia Ramirez, 1928–1931
 Col. Estanislao Mangubat Carungcong, 1931–1934
 Doroteo Jardiniano Mangubat, 1934–1937
 Teodorico Sarosario, 1937–1940
 Felicisimo Medina Carungcong, 1940–1945
 Maximo De la Torre, 1946, appointed
 Gaudencio Geda, 1946, appointed
 Fermin De la Cruz, 1947, appointed
Municipal Mayors (1948-2009)
 Arturo Sayoto Carungcong, 1948–1951
 Emiliano De la Cruz, 1951–1955
 Tomas Hembrador, 1956–1963
 Remigio Medina Carungcong, 1964–1972
 Narciso M. Guevarra, 1972–1982
 Recto M. Cantimbuhan, 1982–1986
 Elpidio Barzaga Jr., 1986–1987, appointed
 Mariano Veluz, March–November 1987 "appointed"
 Roberto Cantimbuhan, November–December 1987 "appointed"
 Leonardo Javier, January 13 – February 2, 1988 "appointed"
 Recto M. Cantimbuhan, 1988–1998
 Elpidio Barzaga Jr., 1998–2007
 Jennifer Austria-Barzaga, 2007–2009

City Mayors (2009–present)
 Jennifer Austria-Barzaga, 2009–2016, 2019–present
 Elpidio Barzaga Jr., 2016-2019

Barangays
Dasmariñas is politically subdivided into 75 barangays or villages. This table shows the barangays, barangay captains, SK chairmen and population of each barangay in Dasmariñas.

Congressional representation

The Legislative district of Dasmariñas is the representation of the city in the House of Representatives of the Philippines. The district corresponds to the 4th Legislative District of Cavite, which was created on October 22, 2009 just right before the ratification of the Charter of the City of Dasmariñas on November 25, 2009. Prior to being entitled its own representation, the municipality of Dasmariñas was represented in Congress as part of the lone district of Cavite from 1907 to 1972, and as part of Region IV-A in the Interim Batasang Pambansa from 1978 to 1984. From 1984 to 1986, it was represented at the Batasang Pambansa as part of the at-large district of Cavite, and was part of the second district of Cavite in the restored House of Representatives from 1987 to 2010.

The congressman of the Legislative district of Dasmariñas is the representative of the city in the lower house of the Philippine Congress. He is elected to serve a three-year term, with a maximum of three terms. Elpidio F. Barzaga Jr. is the incumbent congressman.

Provincial board representation

Despite of its own representation in the congress, it still an ordinary component city, meaning its citizens still elect provincial officials. The city has two representatives to the Sangguniang Panlalawigan ng Cavite (English: Provincial Board of Cavite). The board members are elected to serve a three-year term, with a maximum of three terms. Both Rex Mangubat and Rudy Lara were re-elected unopposed in May 2013, which Lara is the most higher votes in the entire provincial board, he is also as the Senior board member.

City Seal
The seal was the winner of the City Logo making competition sponsored by the City Government. The competition started from February 26, 2010, until March 26 of the same year.
Ryan Suarez, an alumnus of University of Santo Tomas College of Fine Arts and Design created the city seal. The winning seal underwent minor revisions and for the celebration of the 1st Cityhood Anniversary and the 143rd Feast of the Immaculate Conception, from November 25 – December 8, the new city logo was unveiled on November 26, 2010, in the City Quadrangle.
 The buildings, houses and the gear originate from the old seal which now represents the growing community and work force. The church symbolizes the historic Immaculate Conception Church in the Poblacion since it was the site of Battle of Perez-Dasmariñas during the Philippine Revolution against Spain. The sun is from the Philippine flag where each rays represents the provinces including Cavite with significant involvement in the 1896 Revolution. The people represents the family and the people of Dasmariñas.
 The two rice stalks and the farmer represents agriculture that reminds us that the city was once a farming community before evolving into an urbanized city. The globe symbolizes the city's global competitiveness while the green leaf represents the city's environmental advocacy.

Culture

Tourism
The presence of Aguinaldo Highway and Governor's Drive makes the city a driving stop for tourists travelling to Tagaytay and Batangas from Metro Manila and to Laguna from the towns on the western part of Cavite. The city has a large number of hotels and resorts catering to tourists.

The DC Park (also known as Kadiwa Park) located on Congressional Road is a large park featuring statues and animatronics of animals and dinosaurs.

The Museo De La Salle, located within the campus of the De La Salle University-Dasmariñas, is a unique, cultural, cross-disciplinary institution serving as a permanent museum of the De La Salle University System. As a resource center for both indoor and outdoor collections, it dedicates itself to the gathering of collectible objects of intrinsic value significant to the preservation of certain aspects of the Philippine ilustrado lifestyle. It envisions itself to be a leading contributor to the Philippine University museums' movement. It seeks to form productive partnerships that serve communities in creative ways. It vows to assist the member schools of the System in the core areas of teaching, research, community outreach, and administration. Through active collaboration with other museums in the nation, it promotes the interests of museology and upholds appreciation of the arts and culture.

The Daño Street offers a great view of the city's fields and formerly was the site of the  tiangge or a bazaar during the Christmas season.

The Promenade Des Dasmariñas is an urban garden park located along the tributaries of Imus River. and is part of the river rehabilitation and beautification project of the city. It was inaugurated on March 25, 2019.

Events
Dasmariñas has numerous festivals and events held throughout the year, from barangay religious feasts to a citywide festival.
 Gawad Karangalan – date varies
 It is an annual project of the City Government of Dasmariñas that recognizes the academic and personal achievements of outstanding Dasmarineño students in the elementary, secondary and tertiary levels.
 Dasmariñas Day – October 5
 It has been a meaningful tradition of the City Government of Dasmariñas to sponsor a flower offering to commemorate Dasmariñas Day on October 5. This important activity pays tribute our local heroes who gallantly served the town of Dasmariñas consequently paving the way to our success as a city today.
 Paruparo Festival – November 26
 It is celebrated to commemorate the incorporation of the city of Dasmariñas with people dancing in the busy streets with butterfly costumes.
Immaculate Conception Feast Day - December 8
 It is celebrated for the Feast of Immcaculada Concepcion with  marching band parade within the busy streets of Poblacion or the Dasmariñas city proper.

Sports
Burol Main at the proposed Dasmariñas Government Center. Once finished this will allow the city to host meetings, conventions, sports matches and other entertainment events like musicals and concerts.
Also a track oval with football field

There are 104 covered courts in 75 barangays and 10 public schools in the city.

There are also free sports clinics in the city, such as chess, baseball, and taekwondo.

The first Inter–Barangay Sports Tournament was held in 1999 where only two events were played Basketball and Volleyball. Since then it became a regular feature in the annual program of the local government of Dasmariñas.

The City Employees' Sportsfest caters to the employees of the City Government of Dasmariñas. It started in 2005 and since then, it has become a very much awaited event. Department Heads and rank and file employees compete in a friendly competition where talent, skills and perseverance are displayed in a manner comparable to a high level tournament.

Dasmariñas Private Schools Athletic Association commonly known as DPSAA started as an experimental project in 2001 to select athletes who will represent Private Schools in the Municipal Meet (now City Meet). After ten years in existence, DPSAA has become a breeding ground for athletes who hail from private schools.

Education

Several prominent Manila-based universities have established campuses in the city, thus bestowing the city the nickname, "The University City of Cavite."  The De La Salle University-Dasmariñas (27-Hectares) and De La Salle Medical and Health Sciences Institute which has a College of Medicine & other Health-related Colleges are based in the city. The former offers degrees in the liberal arts, commerce, engineering and criminology; while latter focuses on medical courses. At the same time, the De La Salle Medical and Health Sciences Institute operates and manages a hospital, the DLSU Medical Center, the 1st ISO (International Organization for Standardization) Certified Hospital in the Philippines. Other university and college campuses are the Asian Institute of Science and Technology Dasmariñas Campus, STI College Dasmariñas, Southern Luzon College, Philippine Christian University Dasmariñas, National University Dasmariñas, the Technological University of the Philippines – Cavite, National College of Science and Technology Dasmariñas, Emilio Aguinaldo College Cavite Campus, St. Paul College Island Park and many others. The number of higher education institutions in the city allows it to serve the tertiary education needs of its population as well as those of the neighboring towns and provinces. The Christ the King College of Cavite Foundation (formerly "Christ the King School of Cavite") is a private, non-sectarian and coeducational school in San Marino City.

A public college funded by the local government, named Kolehiyo ng Lungsod ng Dasmariñas, is currently being built in Burol Main.

Media
The city also has its own newspaper, Usaping Bayan, the official newspaper of Dasmariñas.

Radio and television channels from Metro Manila are received clearly in the city. DASCA Cable Services provides cable television services to the city. Dasmariñas TV Channel 3, (Digital cable) where upcoming events, projects, announcements, finished projects, etc. are reached out to the Dasmariñas residents, is the city's official television station and is available thru subscription to DASCA Cable Services.

The only radio station in the city is Green FM on 95.9, operated by the De La Salle University-Dasmariñas.

Transportation

Road network

Several roads connect Dasmariñas to other cities and towns. A future expressway, the Cavite–Laguna Expressway, will pass through the western and southern borders of the city. It will be the first expressway in the city.

Aguinaldo Highway (N419) and Governor's Drive (N65) are major highway corridors passing through the city. Paliparan Road and Salitran Road serves the suburbanized areas in the north - east. The city maintains other major thoroughfares, like Carlos Trinidad Avenue, Don Placido Campos Avenue, Congressional Avenue and many others that serves the other barangay's up to the boundaries with other municipalities / cities. The major highways are noted for congestion due to a lack of new roads.

There are newly opened roads in the city named UTS Boulevard located in Pala Pala Barangay Sampaloc 1 and 2 and Congressional Avenue Access road in Talisayan Barangay Sampaloc 4 connecting Island park in Barangay Paliparan 1, With exit in Governor's Drive.

Newly constructed Diversion Road are ongoing particularly in San Jose Dasma - San Francisco Gentri diversion road. And the Paliparan - GMA Cavite diversion road are currently under ongoing construction.

Public transport
Jeepneys can be found around the city, like other cities and town in the Philippines. Jeepney terminals are located in SM City Dasmariñas and Robinsons Place Dasmariñas, both in the Central Business District. It has fixed routes and they are cheaper than buses and taxis.

Tricycles are commonly seen in the busy streets of the city. Tricycle terminals are scattered around the city, such as intersections of small streets.

Taxis are commonly seen in the Central Business District, in SM City Dasmariñas and Robinsons Place Dasmariñas. They are more expensive than tricycles.

There are many bus routes in the city. They will take passengers from the city to Metro Manila, Batangas, Laguna, and other surrounding provinces, cities and towns.

There is a planned extension of the Manila Light Rail Transit System Line 1 or the LRT-1 to Niog, Bacoor. This extension will be a separate rapid transit line to be known as the Manila Light Rail Transit System Line 6 or LRT-6 which will have three stations in the city with its terminus at Governor's Drive. The nearest operating railway station is the Alabang PNR Station. It is about 30 minutes away via Daang Hari Boulevard.

Healthcare
There are 8 major hospitals in Dasmariñas. 1 is public owned government hospital and 7 is privately owned hospital.
 Asia Medic Family Hospital and Medical Center – Sitio Palapala, Sampaloc I
 Medcor Dasma Hospital and Medical Center – Sitio Malinta, Sampaloc 2
 De La Salle University Medical Center – Mangubat Avenue. Zone 4
 Emilio Aguinaldo College Medical Center Cavite – Salitran II
 St. Paul Hospital Cavite, Inc. – Burol II, Bagong Bayan
 Dasmariñas City Medical Center, Inc. – Crossing, Salawag
 Pagamutan ng Dasmariñas – Burol II Bagong Bayan
 GMF Hospital - Zone 4, Poblacion

There are currently 4 City Health Office within the City and established a Barangay Health Center in 75 Barangay.

Establishment of a Drug Testing Center where municipal employees, public school teachers, barangay officials, and policemen are randomly checked free of charge to ensure that they are fit to provide public service. This is also open to the public for 150 pesos.

The Dasmariñas Lying-In Clinic in Barangay Victoria Reyes established in 2001 offers free childbirth services to indigent mothers. To date, 9,372 mothers have already given birth there.

Operation Tule in all barangays is being held every summer which had already provided free services to 23,146 residents as of March 15, 2011.

Operation of Animal Bite Center has been established where free vaccination against rabies are given to residents bitten by dogs and cats. Established in April 2003, it operates with a budget of Php1 million annually and has benefited 16,395 residents.

Free anti-rabies vaccination for pet dogs which now total to 25,385.

In 2016, Pagamutan ng Dasmariñas (English: Dasmariñas Hospital) opened, aimed to serve indigent patients of the city.

Communications
Dasmariñas rely upon agencies for their communication needs. These are the Bureau of Posts, the Bureau of Telecommunications, the RCPI, the Philippine Long Distance Telephone Company (PLDT), Digital Telecommunications (DIGITEL), GLOBE Telecom, ISLACOM, etc. The town has the rightful claim to be tagged as "the internet hub of Cavite" due to the presence of numerous Internet Service provider (ISP) in Dasmariñas. Computer Centers and Internet Cafes, which provides access to the information super highway, are lined along the busy avenues of the city.

All three major telecommunications companies in the Philippines has 4G LTE and voice coverage in the city, including the rural areas.

Notable personalities

 Wilfredo Alicdan, figurative artist and painter
 Elpidio Barzaga Jr., member of the Philippine House of Representatives, former city mayor
 Jennifer Barzaga, city mayor, former member of the Philippine House of Representatives
 Paulo Campos, physician, educator, National Scientist of the Philippines
 Seth Fedelin, actor, model, singer, dancer
 Dominador I. Mangubat, physician, former Governor of Cavite
 Nardong Putik, Leonardo M. Manicio a Caviteno folk hero wielding an amulet 
 Arny Ross, actress, comedian, model, dancer
 Bella Santiago, singer
 Miguel Tanfelix, actor, dancer, host

References

External links

 Official Website of the City of Dasmariñas, Cavite
 Official Website of the Provincial Government of Cavite
 
 [ Philippine Standard Geographic Code]
 Philippine Census Information

 
Cities in Cavite
Populated places established in 1867
1867 establishments in the Philippines
Component cities in the Philippines